Information Builders (ibi), founded in 1975, was a privately held software company headquartered in New York City. Information Builders (ibi) provided services in the fields of Business Intelligence, Data Integration and Data Quality solutions.

History
Gerald D. Cohen, who died in 2020,  co-founded Information Builders (ibi) in 1975 with Peter Mittelman and Martin B. Slagowitz. Their initial product, FOCUS, was designed to enable people without formal computer programming skills to work with information systems.

Information Builders (ibi) was one of the largest privately held software firms, operating in more than 60 locations. In 2001, it established iWay Software, a wholly-owned company focusing on data integration and service-oriented architecture (SOA).

In October 2020, TIBCO Software agreed to purchase ibi. The deal was completed in March 2021.

References

Software companies based in New York (state)
Data companies
Data quality companies
Defunct software companies of the United States